Gephyrosauridae was a family of rhynchocephalians that lived in the Late Triassic and Early Jurassic. The members of Gephyrosauridae were named lepidosaurs in 1985 by Michael Benton. They are considered to be the only rhynchocephalians that lie outside of Sphenodontia, and in some analyses they are recovered as more closely related to squamates than to sphenodontians.

Distribution
Members of Gephyrosauridae are known from the United Kingdom, Italy, and Switzerland.

References

Sphenodontia
Taxa named by Susan E. Evans
Prehistoric reptile families
Late Triassic first appearances
Early Jurassic extinctions